Kein is an EP released by Unsraw on September 26, 2007. It is part of a dual-album release campaign with Abel. The pair of EPs are named after the biblical story of Cain and Abel.

Track listing
"Clevage" – 3:59
"Sora" (空; "Sky") – 6:01
"Addicted to It" – 3:18
"S.I.G." – 3:42
"Tsukioku no Kanata" (～追憶の彼方～; "Beyond the Memories") – 5:34

Notes
 "Sora" was previously featured on the single "Lustful Days".

Unsraw albums
2007 EPs